|}

The Rosebery Handicap is a flat handicap horse race in Great Britain open to horses aged four years or older. It is run at Kempton Park over a distance of 1 mile 2 furlong and 219 yards (2,212 metres), and it is scheduled to take place each year in late March or early April.
It was switched to Kempton's newly opened all-weather track in 2006.  The distance was increased from 10 furlongs to the current 11 furlongs in 2007.

The race was run on Easter Monday prior to 2003, changing to Easter Saturday until 2006.  It is now usually run at a Saturday meeting held either side of Easter, on the same day as the Magnolia Stakes.

Winners since 1988

See also
 Horse racing in Great Britain
 List of British flat horse races

References

 Paris-Turf:
, 
Racing Post

Kempton Park Racecourse
Flat races in Great Britain
Open middle distance horse races